Reinier van Lanschot (born 7 September 1989) is a Dutch politician. In 2018, he co-founded Volt Netherlands with Laurens Dassen and has since served its chairman. He was the party's top candidate for the European Parliament in the 2019 election. Van Lanschot was elected to the co-presidency of Volt Europa (together with Valerie Sternberg of Volt Germany) at the 2019 General Assembly in Sofia, 12–13 October 2019.

Biography 
Van Lanschot grew up in Haarlem and studied law first at the University of Utrecht (2008 to 2013) and later at the University of Amsterdam (2013 to 2014), where he obtained a Master's degree. After graduating, he first started working for a start-up offering innovative legal services. He then worked for Ahold Delhaize as a manager, managed a supermarket in Lelystad and was responsible for the sale of breakfast products in the retail department of Albert Heijn.

When he was preparing the foundation of Volt Nederland in February 2018, he quit his job to focus on party work. Since then, he has been working for the national and European Volt association. Since 2018, van Lanschot has been a trained community organiser and a graduate of the Harvard Kennedy School.

Political work

Volt Nederland 
Together with a few others, van Lanschot founded the party Volt Nederland, the Dutch section of Volt Europa, in Utrecht on 23 June 2018 and was elected as the party's first leader. In doing so, rising nationalism, climate protection and a lack of humane migration policies motivated him to get involved politically.

In the European Parliament elections on 23 May 2019, he was the top candidate and list leader of the Dutch chapter of Volt. When he was elected list leader, he stepped down as Volt chair in order to balance leadership roles within the party. However, he fell short of entering parliament with 1.9% of the electoral vote. During the campaign, he criticised the lack of leaders in Brussels and a constant focus on national interests instead of common European ones.

Volt Europa 
On 13 October 2019, he was elected co-president of the European federation with Valerie Sternberg-Irvani, which he has led since. Together with Francesca Romana D'Antuono, he was re-elected at the general assembly of Volt Europa in Lisbon.

In a guest article in October 2021, van Lanschot, together with Francesca Romana D'Antuono, advocated the establishment of a permanent EU armed corps that could be deployed quickly and autonomously in crises and criticised the slow decision-making and complicated existing processes.

Political positions
About the European Union (EU), Van Lanschot declared that he agreed with the view of eurosceptics but that instead of destroying it he wants to improve it by making it more transparent, democratic and social. Van Lanschot claims that Brexit and the recent spike in popularity of Thierry Baudet have strengthened the party. He and his party also believe in the cause of environmentalism.

Awards 
On 19 December 2018, Van Lanschot and Dassen were named "EuroNederlander of the Year" by the European Movement Netherlands.

On 23 January 2019, Van Lanschot was selected as one of Elsevier weekly magazine's "30 under 30" talents.

References

Living people
Dutch politicians
Volt Europa politicians
21st-century Dutch politicians
Harvard University alumni
University of Amsterdam alumni
Utrecht University alumni
1989 births